Folsom may refer to:

People 
 Folsom (surname)

Places in the United States
 Folsom, Perry County, Alabama
 Folsom, Randolph County, Alabama
 Folsom, California
 Folsom, Georgia
 Folsom, Louisiana
 Folsom, Missouri
 Folsom, New Jersey
 Folsom, New Mexico
 Folsom, Ohio
 Folsom, Pennsylvania
 Folsom, South Dakota
 Folsom, Texas
 Folsom, West Virginia
 Folsom, Wisconsin
 Folsom Lake, California

Other uses 
 Folsom Europe, an annual BDSM and leather subculture street fair held in September in Berlin, Germany
 Folsom Field, an outdoor football stadium in Boulder, Colorado
 Folsom Library, research library on the campus of Rensselaer Polytechnic Institute, located in Troy, New York
 Folsom point, prototype of a spearpoint or arrowhead that was invented by Native Americans and widely distributed in  North America. First discovered near Folsom, New Mexico
 Folsom Public Library, a library in Folsom, California
 Folsom tradition, name given by archaeologists to a sequence of old Paleo-Indian cultures of central North America
 Folsom site, archaeological site in northeastern New Mexico where Folsom Points were first discovered
 Folsom State Prison, a high-security penitentiary near the town of Folsom, California
Johnny Cash at Folsom Prison, a live country & western music album recorded at the prison in 1968
 Folsom Street Fair, held at the end of September during San Francisco's Leather Pride Week
 Folsom Lake College (FLC) is a comprehensive public community college in California